Agonis is a genus in the plant family Myrtaceae.  All are endemic to Western Australia, growing near the coast in the south west.

Description
Only one, Agonis flexuosa, grows to tree size; the others generally grow as tall shrubs.

Agonis formerly contained a number of other species, but the genus was recently split, with the majority moved to Taxandria. The species Agonis grandiflora was segregated to a monotypic genus, Paragonis.

Agonis species generally have fibrous, brown bark, dull green leaves and inflorescences of small, white flowers.  They are best known and most readily identified by the powerful odour of peppermint emitted when the leaves are crushed or torn, though some plants in fact emit an overpowering smell of eucalyptus.

Species

 Agonis baxteri
 Agonis flexuosa Western Australian peppermint, Swan River peppermint, or willow myrtle is the most well-known Agonis, being a common tree in parks and road verges in southern Australia.
 Agonis flexuosa var. flexuosa
 A. f. var. latifolia
 A. fragrans
 A. theiformis
 A. undulata

The name Agonis derives from the Greek agon, meaning gathering or collection, in reference to the tightly clustered flowers.

Agonis is the food plant of the moth Aenetus dulcis.

As with many Australian natives, great care must be taken when transplanting to avoid stressing, straining or jarring the area where the trunk meets the root ball.

References

 
 .
 .
 .

 
Myrtaceae genera
Trees of Australia
Endemic flora of Southwest Australia